Ronnie Fillemon Kanalelo (born 23 May 1971) is a retired Namibian footballer. He took temporary charge of the Namibian national football team in June 2015 following the resignation of Ricardo Mannetti.

Club career
Nicknamed The Magnet, He played from 1991–1997 with Blue Waters of the Namibia Premier League and from 1997–2005 with Mamelodi Sundowns in South Africa.

International career
He also played internationally with Namibia from 1992–1999. He has represented his country in 9 FIFA World Cup qualification matches and played all 3 matches at the 1998 African Cup of Nations for Namibia.

Managerial career
On 17 August 2010, Kanalelo become the new head coach of Tura Magic Football Club who play in the Southern Stream First Division. In November 2010 he became manager of Tigers.

In July 2011 he returned to South Africa to be goalkeeper coach at Maritzburg United.

On 18 June 2015, it was announced that he would lead the Namibian national team on a temporary basis.

References

External links

 Filemon Kanalelo Interview
 Ronnie Kanalelo: The Best Goalie Of All Time

1971 births
Living people
Sportspeople from Walvis Bay
Association football goalkeepers
Namibian men's footballers
Namibia international footballers
1998 African Cup of Nations players
Blue Waters F.C. players
Mamelodi Sundowns F.C. players
Expatriate soccer players in South Africa
Namibian expatriate sportspeople in South Africa
Namibian expatriate footballers
Namibian football managers
Namibia national football team managers